The Right Element is a 1919 British silent drama film directed by Rex Wilson and starring Campbell Gullan, Miriam Ferris and Tom Reynolds. It was based on a story by Roland Pertwee.

Cast
 Campbell Gullan - Frank Kemble
 Miriam Ferris - Madeleine Wade
 Tom Reynolds - Mr. Wade
 Mary Rorke - Aunt Harriet
 Annie Esmond - Mrs. Wade
 John Kelt - Pender
 George K. Gee - Pender Jr.

References

External links

1919 films
1919 drama films
Films directed by Rex Wilson
British silent feature films
British drama films
British black-and-white films
1910s English-language films
1910s British films
Silent drama films